Lina Seitzl (born 3 June 1989) is a German politician of the Social Democratic Party (SPD) who has been serving as a member of the Bundestag since 2021.

Early life and education
Seitzl was born in 1989 in the West German town of Lörrach. From 2009 to 2015, she studied political science and administration at the University of Konstanz and Sciences Po.

Political career
From 2016 to 2021, Seitzl served as chair of the SPD in Konstanz.

Seitzl became a member of the Bundestag in the 2021 elections, representing the Konstanz district. 

In parliament, Seitzl has since been serving on the Committee on Education, Research and Technology Assessment, the Committee on the Environment, Nature Conservation, Nuclear Safety and Consumer Protection, and the Subcommittee on Global Health. 

In addition to her committee assignments, Seitzl is part of the German-Swiss Parliamentary Friendship Group. She has also been a member of the German delegation to the Franco-German Parliamentary Assembly.

Other activities
 German United Services Trade Union (ver.di), Member

References 

Living people
1989 births
People from Lörrach
Social Democratic Party of Germany politicians
Members of the Bundestag 2021–2025
21st-century German politicians
21st-century German women politicians